Pleasant Valley is an unincorporated community on the north side of Blue Marsh Lake in western Berks County, Pennsylvania, United States. The town sits along Route 183 (Bernville Road) in southern Penn Township.

Unincorporated communities in Berks County, Pennsylvania

Unincorporated communities in Pennsylvania